Benjamin Jacob was an Anglican priest in Ireland in the 19th century.

Peacocke was born in Kilkenny and educated at Trinity College, Dublin. He was the incumbent at Caherconlish then Chaplain of Limerick Prison. He was Archdeacon of Limerick from 1881 until 1883.

References

Archdeacons of Limerick
Alumni of Trinity College Dublin
19th-century Irish Anglican priests
Church of Ireland priests
People from Kilkenny (city)
Year of birth missing
Year of death missing